Pamela or Pam Johnson may refer to:
 Pamela Johnson (swimmer), British swimmer
 Pamela Hansford Johnson, English novelist, playwright, poet, literary and social critic
 Pam Johnson (editor), American newspaper editor